Chadpur is a village in Varanasi tehsil, Varanasi district in the Indian state of Uttar Pradesh. It is about 324 kilometers from the state capital Lucknow and 812 kilometers from the national capital Delhi.

Demography
Chadpur has a total population of 3,584 people amongst 499 families. Sex ratio of Chadpur is 899 and child sex ratio is 876. Uttar Pradesh state average for both ratios is 912 and 902 respectively.

Transportation
Chadpur can be accessed by road only as it does not have a railway station. Closest railway station to this village is Varanasi railway station (16 km). Nearest operational airports are Varanasi airport (33 kilometers) and Allahabad Airports (150 kilometers).

See also

Notes
  All demographic data is based on 2011 Census of India.

References 

Villages in Varanasi district